The Utah congressional elections of 2006 were held on November 7, 2006, as part of the United States general elections of 2006 with all three House seats up for election.  The winners served from January 3, 2007, to January 3, 2009.

Overview

District 1

Incumbent Republican Congressman Rob Bishop won re-election to a third term over Democratic nominee Steven Olsen, Constitution Party nominee Mark Hudson, and Libertarian nominee Lynn Badler.

District 2

Although incumbent Jim Matheson (D) won re-election in 2004 by a margin of 13%, his district is in a heavily Republican state. The district includes the most Democratic areas in Utah, such as the liberal communities of Grand County, the large Greek communities of Carbon County, the Navajos of San Juan County, and heavily Democratic Salt Lake City. Matheson is a regular target of the GOP every election. State Representative LaVar Christensen (R) of Draper, a small affluent suburb of Salt Lake City, ran as the Republican nominee in the district. For example, Christensen was one of two major sponsors of a bill that amended Utah's Constitution to ban same-sex marriage. The amendment was rejected by two-thirds of Summit County, half of Grand County, and only passed by 4% in Salt Lake County, while the state as a whole averaged 66%, with the most supportive areas to banning such marriages being located in the first and third districts, not the second. Matheson had approval ratings in the high 70s, the highest for any elected official in Utah.

District 3

Congressman Chris Cannon (R) had represented this district for ten years, but found himself in a competitive primary, just as he had in 2004.  In a campaign that focused almost exclusively on the immigration issue, Businessman John Jacob repeatedly attacked Cannon for his support for a guest worker program.  In May 2006, at the state GOP convention, Jacob surprised Cannon by winning 52 percent of the delegate ballots. "Cannon’s 48 percent showing was especially poor, given that the ballots were cast mainly by the party insiders who dominate such conventions.". The Republican primary was held on June 27, 2006.  While polls showed a close race, in the June Republican primary, Cannon received 32,306 votes (55.8%) and Jacob received 25,589 votes (44.2%).

See also 

United States House of Representatives elections, 2006

References

2006
Utah

2006 Utah elections